Josip Krznarić (born 7 January 1993) is a Croatian professional footballer who most recently played for Slovenian side Krka as a midfielder.

Club career

FC ViOn Zlaté Moravce
He made his professional debut for ViOn Zlaté Moravce against Slovan Bratislava on 19 July 2015.

References

External links
 
 Futbalnet profile
 Eurofotbal profile

1993 births
Living people
Sportspeople from Karlovac
Association football midfielders
Croatian footballers
NK Karlovac players
NK Lučko players
NK Bistra players
FC ViOn Zlaté Moravce players
FCI Levadia Tallinn players
NK Istra 1961 players
SV Lafnitz players
Grazer AK players
NK Krško players
NK Krka players
NK Triglav Kranj players
Croatian Football League players
First Football League (Croatia) players
Slovak Super Liga players
Meistriliiga players
2. Liga (Austria) players
Slovenian Second League players
Croatian expatriate footballers
Expatriate footballers in Slovakia
Croatian expatriate sportspeople in Slovakia
Expatriate footballers in Estonia
Croatian expatriate sportspeople in Estonia
Expatriate footballers in Austria
Croatian expatriate sportspeople in Austria
Expatriate footballers in Slovenia
Croatian expatriate sportspeople in Slovenia